HMC Westeinde is a RandstadRail stop in The Hague, Netherlands.

History 
The station is a stop for lines 2, 3 and 4 and is on the Lijnbaan. Passengers for the Westeinde hospital should alight here. Passengers should change between RandstadRail lines if necessary here, as it is the last/first stop they operate to together.

RandstadRail services 
The following services currently call at HMC Westeinde:

Tram Services

Gallery 

RandstadRail stations in The Hague